This is a list of armoured fighting vehicles, sorted by country of origin.  The information in round brackets ( ) indicates the number of AFVs produced and the period of use.  Prototypes are marked as such.

In the case of multi-national projects, the vehicle may be listed under all applicable countries.

Argentina 
Armoured fighting vehicles produced in Argentina

Tanks 
 Nahuel medium tank (World War II era)
 TAM medium tank (modern)
 Patagón Light tank (modern)

Infantry fighting vehicles 
 VCTP armoured personnel carrier (modern)

Self propelled artillery 
 TAM VCA 155 mm self-propelled gun, "Palmaria" turret (modern)
 VCTM 120 mm mortar carrier (modern)

Australia 
Armoured fighting vehicles produced in Australia
 2 Pounder Anti-tank Gun Carrier (200; World War II)
 3 inch Mortar Carrier (400; World War II)
 Bushmaster Protected Mobility Vehicle (1072 modern)
 ASLAV Infantry Fighting Vehicle (257 modern)
 Dingo (scout car, 245; World War II)
 Rover Light Armoured Car (238; World War II)
 Sentinel cruiser tank (65; World War II)
 Universal Carrier (World War II) – license production
 Yeramba self-propelled gun (14; post-World War II)

Armoured cars 
 Rhino Heavy Armoured Car – World War II armoured car, prototype.
 Rover Light Armoured Car – World War II armoured car.
 S1 Scout Car – World War II scout car.

Austria 
Armoured fighting vehicles produced in Austria
 SPz Ulan (modern, co-development with Spain)
 Steyr 4K 7FA Tracked armoured personnel carrier/infantry fighting vehicle (production from 1977 for Bolivia, Greece (as Leonidas) and Nigeria).
 Saurer 4K 4FA Tracked armoured personnel carrier (~450 built for Austria 1958–1969).
 Pandur I 6x6 armoured personnel carrier
 Pandur II 8x8 armoured personnel carrier
 SK-105 Kürassier light tank (modern)

Armoured cars 
 Junovicz armoured car – World War I design
 Steyr ADGZ – interwar design

Azerbaijan 
Armoured fighting vehicles produced in Azerbaijan
 Matador (mine protected vehicle)
 Marauder (vehicle)
 Ildirim MRAP
 Tufan MRAP

Armoured cars 
 Gurza Patrol Vehicle

Belgium 
Armoured fighting vehicles produced in Belgium
 T15 (World War II)
 T-13 tank destroyer (World War II)
 ACG-1 (World War II)
 Models B1, B2, and B3 (World War II)
 ACEC Cobra Tracked armoured personnel carrier with diesel electric drive. Five prototypes built by 1985. Cobra Armoured Fighting Vehicle (i.e. light tank) variant built 1987.
 Cockerill SIBMAS Wheeled armoured personnel carrier family. Operated by Malaysia from 1983.
 Sabiex Iguana (modern)

Armoured cars 
 Automitrailleuse Minerva – World War I design
 FN 4RM/62F AB – 4×4 armoured car. Sixty two built for Belgian Gendarmerie 1971–1972 in 90 mm gun and 60 mm motor variants.
 Cockerill i-X

Brazil 
Armoured fighting vehicles produced in Brazil

Armoured personnel carrier 
 Charrua XMP-1 – tracked amphibious armoured personnel carrier. Prototype built 1984.
 EE-3 Jararaca
 EE-9 Cascavel
 EE-11 Urutu
 VBTP-MR

Infantry fighting vehicles 
 EE-T4 Ogum – Light tracked reconnaissance vehicle.

Main battle tank 
 EE-T1 Osório Main battle tank (modern)
 Bernardini MB-3 Tamoyo Main battle tank (development of M41 Walker Bulldog).
 Bernardini X1A – rebuild of M3 Stuart light tank with new armour, engine, suspension and 90 mm gun.
 Bernadini X1A2 – new build derivative of X1A tank. At least 30 built 1979–1983 for Brazilian Army.

Self-propelled artillery 
 Astros II MLRS Multiple rocket launcher.

4x4 Armoured car 
 GUARÁ Avibrás 4x4 light armoured car.
 VBL (inbrafiltro) 4x4 light armoured car.
 AV-VU4 AM medium 4X4 armoured car.
 AV-VBL Heavy 4x4 armoured car.

Others 
 EE-17_Sucuri

Bulgaria 
Armoured fighting vehicles produced in Bulgaria
 BTR-60 (APC, modern)
 BMP-1 (IFV, modern)
 MT-LB (APC, modern)
 BMP-23 (IFV, modern)
 T-72M2 (tank, modern)
 2S1 Gvozdika (self propelled artillery, modern)

Canada 
Armoured fighting vehicles produced in Canada

Tanks 
 Ram cruiser tank (World War II era)
 Grizzly Canadian-built M4 Sherman tank (World War II)

Armoured fighting vehicles 
 Kangaroo – World War II era conversions of armoured vehicles to armoured personnel carriers
 Bobcat APC – Cold War prototype. The project was cancelled.
 Bison APC – a light armoured vehicle based on the MOWAG Piranha II
 AVGP (Cougar, Grizzly and Husky) – based on the six-wheeled version of the Mowag Piranha I.
 Coyote Reconnaissance Vehicle – Based on the Mowag Piranha II
 LAV III – a light armoured vehicle based on the Mowag Piranha III
 Fox Armoured Car – Canadian version of Humber Armoured Car
 Otter Light Reconnaissance Car – World War II 4x4 armoured car.

Self propelled artillery 
 Sexton – World War II self-propelled 25-pounder gun.
 Skink – Prototype anti-aircraft tank. (World War II)
 Air Defense Anti-Tank System (ADATS) – Cold War/Modern
 Multi-Mission Effects Vehicle (MMEV) – Prototype. Project canceled. Modern project.

Armoured cars 
 Armoured Autocar – World War I mobile machine gun nest
 INKAS Sentry APC
 C15TA Armoured Truck – World War II armoured load carrier
 Lynx Scout Car – Canadian version of Daimler Dingo.

Colombia

 Zipa – Colombian version of the EE-11 Urutu.
 BTR-80 Caribe – Colombian version of russian BTR-80
 Hunter TR-12 – MRAP
 Hunter XL – MRAP
 ISBI Meteoro – MRAP

China 
Armoured fighting vehicles produced in the People's Republic of China

Tanks
 Type 58 medium tank (Chinese-produced T-34)
 Type 59 main battle tank (Copy of Soviet T-54A Tank)
 Type 59-I
 Type 59-II
 Type 59-IIA
 Type 59-IIA command tank
 Type 59-IIA mine-sweeper tank
 Type 59 Gai (test platform for Western technologies), also known as Type 59G / VT-3 main battle tank
 Type 59D
 Type 59-16 light tank prototype
 Type 62 light tank
 Type 62-I
 Type 62G
 Type 63 amphibious light tank 
 Type 63A
 Type 69 main battle tank prototype
 Type 69-I prototype, incorporating some technologies from captured Soviet T-62
 Type 69-II (A) main battle tank (First production version released in 1982.)
 Type 69-II-B/C command tank
 Type 79, also known as Type 69 III
 Type 80 main battle tank
 Type 85 main battle tank
 Type 88 main battle tank
 Type 90 / VT-1 (Type 90-IIM), exported as MBT-2000 / VT-4 as MBT-3000
 Type 96 / VT-2 (Type 96A) main battle tank
 Type 98 prototype main battle tank
 Type 99 main battle tank
 Type 15 light tank
 VT-5 light tank

Armoured personnel carriers
 Type 63 aka YW-531 armoured personnel carrier (Cold War)
 Type 77 Amphibious armoured personnel carrier (Cold War)
 WZ-523 – Six-wheeled APC. Developed into ZFB91 internal security vehicle used by Peoples Liberation Army.
 Type 85 aka YW-531H, improved T-63 APC (Cold War)
 Type 89 aka YW-534, improved Type 85 APC (Cold War)

Infantry fighting vehicles
 Type 86 aka WZ-501, copy of Soviet BMP-1 (Cold War)
 Type 92 aka WZ-551 wheeled IFV (Modern)
 Type 03 aka ZBD-03 or WZ-506 wheeled IFV (Modern), Chinese airborne infantry fighting vehicle. Early prototypes received the designation ZLC-2000.
 Type 04 aka WZ-502 tracked IFV (Modern)
 Type 05 amphibious IFV.
 Type 08 wheeled armored vehicle
 Type 11 /ST-1 Assault Gun

Croatia 
Armoured fighting vehicles produced in Croatia
 M-84D MBT
 M-95 Degman MBT
 LOV-1

Cyprus

Armoured cars 
 TS (10 examples produced from Soviet supplied ATS-712 prime movers)

Czechoslovakia

Tanks 
 LT vz. 34 – CKD/Praga P-11 light tank. Fifty built for Czechoslovakia.
 LT vz. 35 – Škoda S-IIa light tank built for Czechoslovak army. Captured examples used by Germany as Panzer 35(t).
 LT vz. 38 – CKD/Praga TNH light tank built for Czechoslovakia and export. Adopted by German army as Panzer 38(t) and continued in production until 1942.
 AH-IV – Two man light tank built for export.
 F-IV-HE – 1937 prototype three-man amphibious light tank.
 Škoda S-IIb – Medium tank design rejected by Czechoslovakia in favour of ST vz. 39, but developed into 40M Turán I for Hungary.
 ST vz. 39 – Prototype medium tank design by CKD/Praga. Ordered by Czechoslovak army but production plans stopped by German takeover.

Tankettes 
 Tančík vz. 33 – CKD/Praga two man tankette design – about 70 ordered by Czechoslovakia.
 Škoda S-1 – Two man tankette, rejected in favour of the vz. 33 by Czechoslovakia, but S-1d version armed with 47 mm gun built for Yugoslavia.

Armoured cars 
 OA vz. 27 – interwar design
 OA vz. 30 – interwar 6 wheel design

Egypt 
Armoured fighting vehicles produced in Egypt

Tanks 
 Ramses-II main battle tank
 M1A1 Abrams (1,005) locally assembled

Infantry fighting vehicles 
 EIFV (Egyptian AIFV variant of the M113, locally built)
 Fahd 280-30
 Timsah (armoured personnel carrier) (Fully produced in the domestic factories of the Egyptian army)

Armoured personnel carriers 
 Fahd 240/280 – 4X4 IFV.
 Tiger Kader-120 4X4 APC

Scout and reconnaissance 
 Kader-320 4X4 Light Armoured Reconnaissance

Estonia

Armoured cars 
Armoured cars produced in Estonia
 Arsenal Crossley

Finland 
Armoured fighting vehicles produced in Finland
 Sisu Pasi
 Sisu Nasu
 Patria AMV (Armoured Modular Vehicle) 8x8 Wheeled Vehicle
 BT-42 Assault Gun (18, World War II)

France 
Armoured fighting vehicles produced in France
 AMC 34  (Auto-mitrailleuse de Combat Renault, modèle 1934) – Three-man light tank for French cavalry. Company designation Renault YR.
 AMC 35 – Improved 3-man cavalry tank that replaced AMC 34 in production. Renault ACGI.
 AMR 33 (Auto-mitrailleuse de Reconnaissance Renault, modèle 1934) – Two-man light reconnaissance tank for French cavalry. Renault Type VM.
 AMR 35 (Auto-mitrailleuse de Reconnaissance Renault, modèle 1935) – Improved two man tank for cavalry. Renault Type ZT.
 AMX 10 RC
 AMX 10P
 AMX 13
 AMX 30
 AMX-40
 ARL 44
 Char 2C heavy tank (10; World War I)
 Char B1
 Char NC1 – Improved 1927 derivative of the FT with thicker armour and new suspension. Sold to Japan and Yugoslavia.
 Char NC2 – Improved 1931 derivative of Char NC1. Sold to Greece.
 Citroën AMC P28
 FCM 36 – Two-man diesel-powered infantry support tank. 100 built.
 Hotchkiss H35 – Two-man light tank used by French cavalry and infantry.
 Leclerc
 Panhard 178
 Panhard AML
 Panhard EBR
 Panhard ERC
 Panhard M3
 Panhard VCR
 Panhard VTT
 Renault FT light tank (3694+; World War I)
 Renault R35 – Two-man infantry support tank. Approximately 2000 built. Renault Type ZM.
 Renault R40 – Improved version of R35.
 Saint-Chamond heavy tank (400; World War I)
 Schneider CA1 medium tank (400; World War I)
 Schneider AMC P16 (AMC - automitrailleuse de cavalerie)  cavalry half-track
 Somua S-35
 VAB
 Vextra
 VXB

Armoured cars 
 AMX 10 RC
 Berliet VPDM – interwar 6x4 armoured car.
 Berliet VUC – interwar four wheel design
 Berliet VUDB – interwar four wheel design
 Berliet VUM – interwar four wheel design
 Charron armoured car – pre-World War I vehicle.
 ERC 90 Sagaie
 Laffly 50AM – interwar four wheel design.
 Laffly 80AM – interwar four wheel design.
 Laffly S15 TOE – World War II six wheel design.
 Laffly W15 TCC – World War II six wheel design.
 Panhard 165/175 – interwar four wheel design
 Panhard 178
 Panhard AM40-P – interwar experimental eight wheel design
 Panhard AML- 4x4 with 90 mm main armament
 Panhard VBL Véhicule Blindé Léger – a modern French scout car designed for reconnaissance
 VBC-90
 Vextra 105 – a modern 8x8 design.
 White-Laffly AMD – World War I armoured car.

Georgia

Fast attack vehicles 
 DELGA-1 series

Armoured personnel carriers 
 Didgori-1
 Didgori-2
 Command / Communications vehicle
 MedEvac
 Didgori-3

Infantry fighting vehicle 
 Lazika

Self-propelled artillery 
 RS-122

Germany 
Armoured fighting vehicles produced in Germany

Tanks 
 A7V heavy tank (22; World War I)
 A7VU heavy tank. Prototype World War I heavy tank, with similar layout (all-round tracks and armament mounted in sponsons) to British tanks. One completed.
 E-Series prototypes
 Sturmpanzerwagen Oberschlesien tank
 K Panzerkampfwagen super-heavy tank (2 incomplete; World War I)
 Grosstraktor heavy tank – prototypes built by Daimler-Benz, Rheinmetall and Krupp in 1929s.
 LK I light tank
 LK II light tank
 Leichttraktor light tank
 Panther
 Panther II prototype
 PzKpfw. I Ausf. A Light tank
 Flammenwerfer auf PzKpfw. I Ausf. A flame-thrower tank
 Kleiner Panzerbefehlswagen command tank (190)
 PzKpfw I Ausf. B light tank
 Flammenwerfer auf PzKpfw. I Ausf. B flame-thrower tank
 Panzer II light tank
 Panzer III medium tank
 Panzer IV medium tank
 Leopard 1
 Leopard 2
 Jaguar 1
 Jaguar 2
 TH200
 Maus superheavy tank prototype (2 completed, 9 halted in production)
 Tiger I
 Tiger II
 Wiesel 1 (and 2)
 KJPz HS-30 tank destroyer (KanoneJagdPanzer)
 MBT-70 prototype

Armoured/infantry fighting vehicles 
 Sd.Kfz. 250 WWII reconnaissance fighting vehicle
 Sd.Kfz. 251 WWII infantry half-track
 Schützenpanzer Lang HS.30 Cold War infantry combat vehicle
 Schützenpanzer SPz 11-2 Kurz Cold War tracked reconnaissance vehicle
 Marder 1 A3 Cold War infantry combat vehicle
 Marder 1 A5 Cold War infantry combat vehicle
 Boxer (Armoured Fighting Vehicle), with the Netherlands and United Kingdom (modern)
 Puma (IFV) Modern infantry combat vehicle

Self-propelled artillery 
 PzH 2000

Armoured cars 
 Bussing A5P – experimental World War I 4x4 armoured car
 Daimler DZVR 21 / Sd.Kfz. 3 – interwar 4 wheel armoured car
 Ehrhardt E-V/4 – World War I vehicle
 Kfz 13 – interwar 4 wheel light armoured car
 Leichter Panzerspähwagen – a series of light 4x4 armoured cars from Nazi Germany
 Schwerer Panzerspähwagen – a family of 6x6 and 8x8 heavy armoured cars deployed by Nazi Germany
 Steyr ADGZ – ex-Austrian 8x8, more ordered by Waffen-SS units 
 Spähpanzer Luchs – modern 8x8 vehicle
 AGF (Light infantry vehicle) – 4x4 vehicle, used by the special forces (KSK)
 Fennek – 4x4 reconnaissance vehicle
 LAPV Enok – 4x4 patrol vehicle

Greece 
Armoured fighting vehicles produced in Greece

Tanks 
 ELBO Leopard 2 Hel MBT (170)

Infantry carriers 
 ELBO Leonidas-1 (Copy of the Steyr 4K 7FA)
 ELBO Leonidas-2 APC
 ELBO Kentaurus AIFV

Wheeled armoured vehicles 
 Peerless-Vickers Armored Car (Modification/Improvement in Greece) (Pre-WWII)
 Namco Tiger Armored Vehicle (proposed)
 EODH Hoplite

Hungary 
Armoured fighting vehicles produced in Hungary:

Tanks 
 Toldi – Light tank (World War II)
 40M Turán I – Medium tank (World War II)
 44M Tas - Prototype medium tank (World War II)
  - Interwar prototype amphibious high-speed light tank

Armoured cars 
 Romfell – World War I design
 39M Csaba - (World War II)
 Rába VP - (Interwar era)
 Crossley Páncélgépkocsi - (Interwar recon cars based on imported Crossley BGV trucks) 
Alvis Straussler AC3 Produced for Alvis-Straussler Ltd. in WM Budapest

Armored Personnel Carriers 
 D-442 FUG – Similar to, but not based on BRDM-1, carrier for reconnaissance teams
 PSZH-IV – Similar to, but not based on BRDM-2, carrier for motorized infantry 
 Lynx IFV production under a German license after 2023
 H18.240 DAEZ MRAP truck based on Rába H18 series 6x6 8ton truck

Self propelled artillery 
 43M Zrínyi – SP gun (World War II)
 40M Nimród – AA tank (World War II) the first mass-produced SPAA

India 
Armoured fighting vehicles produced in India

Main battle tanks 
 Arjun Mk 1 – main battle tank
 Arjun Mk 1A - main battle tank
 Arjun Mk 2 – 4th generation main battle tank
 T-90S – license produced/assembled main battle tank
 T-72M1 – license produced/assembled main battle tank
 Tank EX – Main battle tank
 Vijayanta – Cold War era main battle tank, derived from Vickers MBT

Infantry fighting vehicles 
 Abhay IFV – infantry combat vehicle
 BMP-1 -Carrier Mortar Tracked license produced/assembled infantry combat vehicle
 BMP-2 – license produced/assembled infantry Combat Vehicle
 DRDO light tank – Cold war era infantry fighting vehicle
 TATA FICV – Infantry Fighting Vehicle and Engineers Fighting Vehicle
 Mahindra FICV – Infantry fighting vehicle And engineers fighting vehicle

Armoured personnel carrier 
 Carrier Mortar Tracked – Self-propelled mortar
 DRDO Armoured Engineer Reconnaissance Vehicle – Engineer fighting vehicle and armoured reconnaissance vehicle
 TATA Kestrel – Wheeled 8 x 8 armoured personnel carrier and amphibious armoured carrier
 VRDE Light Armoured Vehicle – Wheeled 8 x 8 armoured personnel carrier and armoured reconnaissance carrier co-developed with Canadian General Dynamics Land Systems and Swiss Mowag
 Kartik BLT – Armoured bridge launching vehicle

Armoured cars 
 Armoured Carrier Wheeled Indian Pattern – World War II 4 x 4 armoured cars
 Land Rover 1515F – 4 x 4 Armoured vehicle
 Mahindra Rakshak – 4 x 4 Armoured vehicle
 Mahindra Striker – 4 x 4 Light armoured vehicle
 Mahindra Marksman – 4 x 4 Armoured vehicle
 Mahindra Axe – 4 x 4 Light armoured vehicle
 Mahindra Mine Protected Vehicle – 6 x 6 Armoured personnel carrier
 Mahindra Armored Light Specialist Vehicle - 4 x 4 specialist light-armoured vehicle
 TATA LSV – 4 x 4 Armoured vehicle
 TATA LAMV – 4 x 4 Armoured vehicle
 TATA Mine Protected Vehicle – 6 x 6 Armoured personnel carrier 
 OFB MPV 1 – 6 x 6 Armoured personnel carrier 
 OFB MPV 2 – 6 x 6 Armoured personnel carrier 
 EME 515 Windy & Tuffy & Takshak & Gypsy

Self propelled howitzers 
 HT-130 Catapult – 130 mm Self-propelled artillery based on the Vijayanta MBT hull
 Bhim self-propelled howitzer – 155 mm Self-propelled howitzer
 OFB 105mm SPG – 105 mm Self Propelled Howitzer based on BMP-2
 L & T Self-propelled howitzer – 155 mm Self-propelled howitzer based on Korean K9 Thunder
 Kalyani Self-propelled howitzer – 155 mm Self-propelled howitzer based on Arjun Mk 2 chassis
 Tata Self-propelled howitzer – 155 mm Self-propelled howitzer based on Arjun Mk 2 chassis

Indonesia 
Armoured fighting vehicles produced in Indonesia
 Pindad Panser – ANOA 6X6 APS

Iran 
Armoured fighting vehicles produced in Iran

Tanks
 Karrar MBT
 Zulfiqar 1 MBT
 Zulfiqar 2 MBT (Prototype)
 Zulfiqar 3 MBT
 Type 72Z Medium tank
 Tiam Medium tank
 T-72M Rakhsh T-72M variant developed by the IRGC with new ERA, sights, an RWS. and many other upgrades.
 T-72S MBT (under license)
 Tosan light tank

Tank destroyers
 Aqareb Wheeled 8x8 Tank Destroyer
 Pirooz on ARAS 4x4

Infantry fighting vehicles
 Makran IFV
 Cobra BMT-2 Boragh with either a 30mm Shipunov 2A42 auto-cannon or a ZU-23-2
 BMP-1 APC (under license)
 BMP-2 APC (under license)

Armoured personal carriers
 Sayyad AFV 
 Boragh APC
 Rakhsh 4x4 APC
 Sarir 4x4 APC
 Hoveyzeh Tracked light vehicle
 BPR-82 Sedad 23mm BTR-60PB with an unmanned ZU-23-2.
 Heidar-6 BTR-60PB with a 2A28 Grom and a new engine.
 Heidar-7 BTR-60PB with unmanned 23mm turret, ERA, and a new engine.

Infantry mobility vehicles
 Toofan 4x4 IMV
 Ra'ad 6x6 IMV
 Roueintan 4x4 IMV
 Fateq 4x4 IMV

Self-propelled artillery
 Raad-1 Self-propelled artillery
 Raad-2 Self-propelled artillery
 Heidar-41 122mm truck based self-propelled artillery.
 HM-41 Truck based automatic loading version

Iraq 
Armoured fighting vehicles produced in Iraq
 Lion of Babylon (Asad Babil)
 T-72M1 "Saddam"
 Modified Iraqi special Republican Guard BMP-1
 Modified MT-LB fitted with 23 mm 2A7
 MT-LB with wider tracks

Ireland

Armoured cars 
Armoured vehicles produced in Ireland
 Leyland Armoured Car (4)
 Morris Mk IV Armoured Car (1)
 Ford Mk V Armoured Car (14)
 Ford Mk VI Armoured Car (28)
 Dodge Armoured Car (5)
 Timoney Armoured Personnel Carrier (14)

Israel 
Armoured fighting vehicles produced in Israel
 Super Sherman
 Merkava tank
 Magach
 Sabra
 Achzarit
 Zelda
 Ro'em or L-33
 Puma combat engineering vehicle
 Nagmashot
 Nagmachon
 Nakpadon
 Namer

Armoured cars 
 Golan Armored Vehicle
 RAM (light combat vehicle) – 4x4 multi-purpose armoured vehicle.
 Plasan Sand Cat
 AIL Storm
 WOLF

Italy 
Armoured fighting vehicles produced in Italy
 Fiat M11/39
 Fiat M13/40
 Fiat M14/41
 M15/42 tank
 Fiat M16/43
 Carro Armato P 40 Heavy Tank
 Fiat 3000
 Fiat L6/40
 OF-40 Main battle tank
 Ariete (200)
 VCC-1 Camillino – Tracked Infantry Armoured Fighting Vehicle based on M113 with additional sloped armour. Similar to AIFV. Built for Italy and Saudi Arabia.
 VCC-2 – Italian version of M-113 with additional armour and firing ports for passengers.
 Dardo (500; deliveries ongoing)
 Centauro wheeled tank destroyer (484)
 Freccia, infantry fighting variant of the Centauro
 Puma 4x4 (330; not complete as of mid-2005)
 Puma 6x6 (250; not complete as of mid-2005)
 Fiat 6614 G4x4
 Palmaria Self-propelled howitzer

Armoured cars 
 Autoblindo Lancia AB IZ – 4 wheel design of World War I
 Autoblindo Fiat AB 611 – 6x4 armoured car of the interwar period
 Ansaldo Armored Car – prototype of the interwar period (1925) based on a Pavesi tractor
 Autoblindo AB 40
 Autoblindo AB 41
 Autoblindo AB 43
 Sahariana – a jeep-like armoured car built by an independent manufacturer during World War II
 Autoblindo Lince – an Italian version of the British Daimler Dingo
 Centauro – 8x8 wheeled tank destroyer
 Puma – modern 4x4 or 6x6 vehicle

Japan 
Armoured fighting vehicles produced in Japan

Amphibious tanks 
 Type 2 Ka-Mi amphibious tank
 Type 3 Ka-Chi amphibious tank
 Type 5 To-Ku prototype amphibious tank

Light tanks 
 Type 2 Ke-To light tank
 Type 4 Ke-Nu light tank
 Type 5 Ke-Ho prototype light tank
 Type 95 Ha-Go light tank
 Type 98 Ke-Ni light tank

Medium tanks 
 Type 1 Chi-He medium tank
 Type 3 Chi-Nu medium tank
 Type 4 Chi-To prototype medium tank
 Type 5 Chi-Ri prototype medium tank
 Type 89 Chi-Ro (I-Go) medium tank
 Type 97 Chi-Ha medium tank
 Type 98 Chi-Ho prototype medium tank

Main battle tanks 
 Type 61
 Type 74
 Type 90
 Type 10

Miscellaneous armoured vehicles 
 Type 87 Chi-I medium tank prototype
 Type 92 Jyu-Sokosha tankette
 Type 94 tankette
 Type 97 Te-Ke tankette
 Type 95 heavy tank prototype
 Type 98 Ta-Se prototype self-propelled anti-aircraft gun
 Type 98 20 mm AAG tank prototype self-propelled anti-aircraft gun
 Type 98 So-Da armoured personnel carrier
 Type 1 Ho-Ki armoured personnel carrier
 Type 2 Ho-I infantry support tank
 Type 4 Ka-Tsu amphibious landing craft
 Type 4 Ha-To self-propelled mortar
 Type 4 Ho-Ro self-propelled gun
 Type 4 Ho-To prototype self-propelled gun
 Type 1 Ho-Ni I tank destroyer
 Type 1 Ho-Ni II 105 mm tank destroyer
 Type 3 Ho-Ni III tank destroyer
 Type 5 Na-To tank destroyer
 Type 1 Ho-Ha armoured halftrack
 Type 75 155 mm self-propelled howitzer
 Type 99 155 mm Self-propelled howitzer
 Type 60 Self-propelled 106 mm Recoilless Gun
 Type 60 armored personnel carrier
 Type 73 Armored Personnel Carrier
 Type 96 Armored Personnel Carrier
 Mitsubishi Type 89 IFV
 Komatsu LAV
 Type 87 self-propelled anti-aircraft gun
 Short Barrel 120 mm gun tank
 Naval 12 cm SPG prototype

Malaysia 
Armoured fighting vehicles produced in Malaysia

Tracked armoured fighting vehicle 
 ACV-300

Wheeled armoured fighting vehicle 
 DefTech AV8

Wheeled armoured personnel carrier 
 DefTech AV4

Mexico 
Armoured fighting vehicles produced in Mexico
 DN-III Armoured Personnel Vehicle
 DN-IV "Caballo" (Horse) Armoured Personnel Vehicle
 DN-V Bufalo (Buffalo) Armoured Personnel Vehicle
 DN-VI Armoured Personnel Vehicle  (Prototype, never reached production)
 DN-VII Armoured Personnel Vehicle (Prototype, never reached production)
 Sedena-Henschel HWK-11 – joint project with West Germany

Myanmar
Armoured vehicle producing in Myanmar.

Tanks

 MALT(Myanmar Army Light Tank):105 mm Light tank based on 2S1U chassis.

Infantry fighting vehicles

 BAAC-73 :(4x4)Infantry Fighting Vehicle.
 BAAC-83 :(4x4)Infantry Fighting Vehicle. 
 BAAC-84 :(4x4)Infantry Fighting Vehicle.
 BAAC-85 :(4x4)Infantry Fighting Vehicle.
 BAAC-86 :(4x4)Infantry Fighting Vehicle.
 BAAC-87 :(4x4)Infantry Fighting Vehicle.

Armoured personnel carriers

 ULARV-1 :(4x4)Armoured Personnel Carrier with a 14.5 mm machine gun.
 ULARV-2 :(4x4)Armoured Personnel Carrier with a 14.5 mm machine gun and a short range Igla turret.
 ULARV-3(Prototype) :(6x6)Armoured Personnel Carrier with a RCWS.

Army scout vehicle

 MAV-1 :(4 x 4)Light Armoured Vehicle.
 MAV-2 :(4 x 4)Light Armoured Vehicle.
 MAV-3 :(4 x 4)Light Armoured Vehicle.
 MAV-4 :(4 x 4)Light Armoured Vehicle.
 Naung Yoe Jeep :(4 x 4)Armoured Jeep.
 Inlay Jeep:(4 x 4)Armoured Jeep.

Armoured air-defence vehicle

 MADV-1 :(4 x 4)Armoured Air-defence Vehicle based on locally made Naung Yoe Armoured Jeep.
 MADV-2 :(4 x 4)Armoured Air-defence Vehicle based on locally made MAV-1 Light Armoured Vehicle.

Netherlands 
Armoured fighting vehicles produced in the Netherlands
 Boxer PWV with Germany and the United Kingdom (modern)
 Fennek

Armoured cars 
 Braat Overvalwagen
 DAF M39
 DAF YP-408
 Stadswacht Overvalwagen

New Zealand 
Armoured fighting vehicles produced in New Zealand
 Bob Semple tank prototype
 Schofield tank prototype, rejected by UK
 Universal Carrier (World War II)

Armoured cars 
 Beaverette NZ – World War II light armoured car similar to the British Beaverette

North Korea 
Armoured fighting vehicles produced in North Korea

Tanks 
 Ch'onma-ho 2nd gen. main battle tank (Cold War era)
 Pokpung-ho 4th gen. main battle tank (Modern)
 M2020 tank
 Type 82 "Sinhŭng" light tank
 M-1973 VTT-323 APC
 M-1992 APC (Based on BRDM-2)
 M-1978 "Koksan" 170 mm SP
 Type 89 "Koksan" 170 mm SP
 M-1974 152 mm SP
 M-1975 130 mm SP
 M-1992 130 mm SP
 M-1977 122 mm SP
 M-1981 122 mm SP
 M-1991 122 mm SP
 M-1992 120 mm SP

Pakistan

Main battle tanks (MBT) 
 Al-Khalid
 Al Khalid-1 (AK-1)
 Al-Khalid-2 (AK-2) - (Under Development) 
 Al-Zarrar – MBT 
 Type-85 - Pakistani T-85IIAP variants were license made at HIT.
 Type 69 - T-69IIMP variants were license made in Pakistan.

Armoured Recovery Vehicles (ACRV) 
 Type 84 - W653 variant was license made at HIT

Infantry Fighting Vehicles (IFV) 
 Hamza IFV -

Special Operations Vehicles (SOV) 
 Predator SOV -

Multirole Combat Vehicles (MCV) 
 Hamza 8x8 - 
 Hamza 6x6 - 
 Hamza 6x6 Mk.2 -

Armoured personnel carriers (APC) 
 ASV Dragoon - License made at HIT
 Interceptor 4x4 B6 - ASV
 Interceptor 4x4 B7 - ASV
 Mohafiz - internal security vehicles
Interceptor ASV
 M-113 - License made domestic variants
 APC Talha – armoured personnel carrier
 Al-Hadeed - Armoured Recovery Vehicle 
 Al-Qaswa – armoured logistics vehicle 
 Sakb – Armoured Command Vehicle
 Protector - ASV

Self propelled guns (SPG) 
 M109 - M-109A2 SPG License made at HIT

Poland 
Armoured fighting vehicles produced in Poland. See also list of Polish armoured fighting vehicles.

Armoured cars 
 Ford FT-B (~17)
 wz. 28
 wz. 29 Ursus (11)
 wz. 34 (~80)
 Kubuś
 Tur (military vehicle)
 Jenot (prototype)
 Żubr
 Dzik, a modern modular AC and APC

Armoured personnel carriers 
 TOPAS-2AP (~200 until 1985)
 OT-62
 OT-64 SKOT

Infantry fighting vehicles 
 BWP-1 IFV (1298)
 BWR-1K (22) – reconnaissance variant of BWP-1
 BWR-1S (16) – reconnaissance variant of BWP-1
 KTO Rosomak

Tankettes 
 TK-1 (1 prototype)
 TK-2 (1 prototype)
 TK-3 (~300)
 TKW
 TKD (4 prototypes)
 TKF (~18)
 TKS (~390)
 TKS-D (2 prototypes)

Tanks

Light tanks 
 4TP PZInż.140 (1 prototype)
 7TP dw
 7TP jw
 10TP fast tank (1 prototype)

Main battle tanks 
 T-55AM Mérida (modernized T-55)
 T-55AD-2M (command variant)
 T-55AMS  (modernized T-55)
 T-55AD-1M (modernized T-55)
 T-72M1Z (upgraded T-72M1)
 PT-91 Twardy (233)
 PT-91A (export prototype)
 PT-91Z (export demonstrator)
 PT-91E (export demonstrator)
 PT-91M (export for Malaysia, 48)
 PT-94 Goryl (cancelled project based on the PT-91)
 Leopard 2
 PL-01 prototypes; Polish—British project to enter production in 2018

Self-propelled anti-aircraft weapons 
 PZA Loara
 ZSU-23-4MP Biała

Armoured recovery vehicles 
 WZT-1 ARV based on T-54 chassis
 WZT-2 ARV based on T-55 hull
 WZT-3 ARV based on PT-91 chassis, armed with 12.7mm machine gun
 WZT-4 ARV based on PT-91 chassis

Amphibious vehicles 
 PZInż.130 or PZInż.140 amphibious tank, based on 4TP light tank (1 prototype)

Portugal 
Armoured fighting vehicles produced in Portugal:
 Bravia Chaimite, wheeled 4x4 APC
 Bravia Comando, wheeled 4x4 armoured patrol vehicle

Romania 
Armoured fighting vehicles produced in Romania

Armoured cars 
 ABC-79M
 ABI

Armoured personnel carriers 
 MLVM (armoured vehicle)
 TAB-71
 TAB-77
 
 RN-94 – prototype
 Saur 1 – prototype
 Saur 2 – prototype
 Zimbru 2000 – prototype

Infantry fighting vehicles 
 MLI-84 – derived from BMP-1
 MLI-84M Jderul – modern upgrade of MLI-84

Tanks

World War II
 R-1 – 35 bought from Czechoslovakia, designed specially for the Romanian army, 1 produced in Romania
 R-2 – Czechoslovak LT vz. 35 with changes made specially for the Romanian army (see R-2c)
 R-3 – proposal
 1942 medium tank – proposal
 T-34 with 120/150 mm gun – proposal

Modern 
 TR-580 (prototypes called TR-77)
 TR-85
 TR-85M1 Bizonul – modern upgrade of TR-85 tanks
 TR-125 – prototypes of local produced variant of T-72

Tank destroyers 
 Mareșal – prototypes and early serial production built during WWII, later used by the Germans in the development of the Hetzer
 TACAM T-60 – 34 conversions of Soviet light tanks during WWII
 TACAM R-2 – 20 conversions of Czechoslovak-supplied R-2 light tanks during WWII
 TACAM R-1 – proposal
 TACAM T-38 – proposal
 Vânătorul de care R35 – tank destroyer version of the Renault R35

Self-propelled artillery 
 Model 89 – licensed built 2S1 Gvozdika on MLI-84 chassis

Self-propelled anti-aircraft weapons 
 CA-95 – modern, carries four surface-to-air missiles

Russian Empire 
Armoured fighting vehicles produced in the Russian Empire. Also see #Russian Federation, #Soviet Union on this page.
 Vezdekhod (prototype only)
 Tsar Tank wheeled armoured gun carrier (prototype only)
 Austin-Putilov, improved Austin Armoured Car
 Izhorski-Fiat armoured car
 Poplavko-Jeffery – An oddly shaped design, built on chassis of a Thomas B. Jeffery Company truck. It had a good service record and was used after the war by Poland.
 Garford-Putilov Armoured Car
 Russo-Balt armoured car

Russian Federation 
Armoured fighting vehicles produced in the Russian Federation. Also see #Russian Empire, #Soviet Union on this page.
 BTR-90
 Black Eagle tank prototype
 BMD-4
 T-80U
 T-90
 T-95 rumoured
 Armata Universal Combat Platform

Saudi Arabia 
Armoured fighting vehicles produced in Kingdom of Saudi Arabia

Infantry fighting vehicles 
 Al-Fahd IFV
 Al-Faris IFV

Armoured personnel carriers & support vehicles 
 Shibl-1 4×4 APC Four seats
 Shibl-2 4×4 APC Eight seats
 Al-Masmak APC
 Al-Naif armoured vehicle
 Al-Mansoor armoured vehicle
 Der' Al-Jazeerah-1 AFV
 Der' Al-Jazeerah-2 AFV
 Al-Kaser IFV for counter-terrorism
 Al-Naif 5 APC
 Al-Naif 7 APC
 Al-Naif 9 APC
 Al-Faisal AFV
 Salman Al-Hazm

Serbia 
Armoured fighting vehicles produced in Serbia
 M-84 main battle tank (planned to be upgraded to M-2001)
 M-80A infantry fighting vehicle (planned to be upgrade to M-98 Vidra)
 BOV M-86 armoured personnel carrier, used by military police
 M-84AI armoured recovery vehicle version of M-84, used in tank battalions
 BOV-1 antitank guided missile vehicle
 Lazar BVT mine resistant, ambush protected armoured fighting vehicle

Singapore 
Armoured fighting vehicles produced in Singapore
 Bionix 28-ton replacement for M113 with 25 mm Bushmaster cannon (Bionix 25) or the CIS 40 mm AGL/.50 calibre HMG (Bionix 40/50)
 Bionix Updated Version of the Bionix with better armour and 30 mm Bushmaster
 Bronco All Terrain Tracked Carrier
 SSPH Primus 155 mm SP gun
 Terrex Infantry carrier vehicle
 Hunter AFV Armored Fighting Vehicle
 M113A2 Ultra IFV + M113A2 Ultra OWS Armoured personnel carrier
 Light Strike Vehicle Light Strike Vehicle
 Peacekeeper PRV Armoured personnel carrier
 Belrex Protected Combat Support Vehicle/ MRAP
 FH-2000 Towed howitzer
 SLWH Pegasus Towed howitzer
 Bionix Armoured combat engineering vehicle
 Bionix ARV Armoured combat engineering vehicle
 Bionix BLB Armored vehicle-launched Bridge
 ST Aerospace Skyblade Man-portable mini-UAV

Slovakia 
Armoured fighting vehicles and armored military support vehicles produced in Slovakia.

 Aligator 4x4 - first generation multi-purpose armored car
 Aligator 4x4 Master - upgraded prototype of first generation armored car
 Aligator 4x4 Master II - second generation multi-purpose armored car
 Tatrapan 6x6 - armored truck (with armoured personnel carrier variant), derived from Tatra 815 truck
 Božena 5 - mine clearing vehicle, mine-flail
 Zuzana - wheeled self-propelled artillery (self-propelled howitzer, first generation, derived from DANA)
 Himalaya - tracked self-propelled artillery prototype (Zuzana howitzer turret on T-72 chassis), evaluated but did not enter production 
 BRAMS - wheeled self-propelled anti-aircraft system prototype (anti-aircraft turret on Tatra 815 chassis), not in production 
 Zuzana 2 - wheeled self-propelled artillery (self-propelled howitzer, second generation)
 EVA - wheeled self-propelled artillery prototypes (self-propelled howitzer, lighter and smaller than the Zuzana series, designed for easy airlift and transport}, currently not in production

Slovenia 
Armoured fighting vehicles produced in Slovenia
 Valuk 6x6 (LWAV)
 M-55S – Upgraded MBT T-55
 Krpan 8x8 – Modernized Steyer-Daimler-Puch Pandur II
 Svarun 8x8

South Africa 
Armoured fighting vehicles designed and produced in South Africa

Tanks

Main battle tanks 
 Olifant Mk1A

Prototype tanks 
 Semel
 Skokiaan

Self propelled artillery 
 G6 howitzer
 Valkiri

Infantry fighting vehicles 
 Ratel
 Mbombe

Armoured personnel carriers 
 Buffel
 Casspir
 Hippo
 Mamba
 Marauder
 RCV-9
 Reva
 RG-12
 RG-19
 RG-31 Nyala
 RG-32 Scout
 RG-33
 RG-34
 RG-35
 RG-41
 RG Outrider
 PUMA M26-15

Armoured cars 
 Eland
 Marmon-Herrington Armoured Car
 Rooikat

South Korea 
Armoured fighting vehicles produced in South Korea
 K1 MBT
 K1A1 MBT
 K2 Black Panther MBT
 K-200 IFV
 K21 IFV
 K242A1 / K281A1 Mortar Carrier
 K263A1 Self-Propelled radar-guided Vulcan
 K288A1 Recovery Vehicle
 K30 Biho twin 30 mm SPAA
 K9 Thunder 155 mm SPH
 K10 Ammunition Resupply Vehicle (ARV)
 Barracuda APC

Soviet Union 

Armoured fighting vehicles produced in the Union of Soviet Socialist Republics. Also see #Russian Empire, #Russian Federation, #Ukraine on this page, and list of Soviet tanks.
 KV-1/KV-2
 IS-2/IS-3
 BT tank
 BT-7
 PT-76
 T-10
 T-12
 T-24
 T-26
 T-28
 T-34
 T-34-85
 T-35
 T-40
 T-50
 T-54
 T-55
 T-60
 T-62
 T-64
 T-70
 T-72
 T-80
 T-80 light tank

Air-portable fighting vehicles 
 9K22 Tunguska
 Antonov A-40 flying tank prototype
 ASU-57
 ASU-85
 BMD-1
 BMD-2
 BMD-3
 BTR-D

Self-propelled guns 
 2A3 Kondensator 2P
 2S1 Gvozdika
 2S3 Akatsiya
 2S4 Tyulpan
 2S5 Giatsint-S
 2S7 Pion
 2S9 Nona
 2S19 Msta
 2S23 Nona-SVK
 2S30 Iset
 2S31 Vena
 SU-5
 SU-6
 SU-7
 SU-8
 SU-12
 SU-14
 SU-57 (Lend-lease 57 mm Gun Motor Carriage T48)
 SU-57B
 SU-74
 SU-76
 SU-85
 SU-85A, prototype based on SU-76
 SU-85B, prototype based on SU-76
 SU-100
 SU-100Y
 SU-122
 SU-122P, long-barreled prototype
 SU-152
 SU-212
 SU-BU-10
 ISU-122
ISU-130
 ISU-152

Armoured cars 
 FAI – interwar
 BA-I, BA-3, BA-6, BA-9, BA-10, BA-11 – a series of interwar 6-wheeled heavy armoured cars
 BA-5 – interwar
 BA-20 – interwar
 BA-21 – interwar
 BA-27 – interwar
 BA-64, World War II
 BRDM-1 or BTR-40P
 BRDM-2
 BRM-1 or BMP-R
 D-8 Armored Car – interwar
 D-12 Armored car – interwar
 LB-23 – World War II
 LB-62 – World War II
 LB-NATI – World War II

Personnel carriers 
 BMP-1
 BMP-2
 BMP-3
 BTR-40
 BTR-50
 BTR-60
 BTR-70
 BTR-80
 BTR-90
 BTR-152
 BTR-T
 MT-LB

Spain 

Armoured fighting vehicles produced in Spain

Tanks 
 Trubia A4
 Verdeja
 AMX-30E, codevelopment with France
 Lince (unfinished tank project)
 Leopard 2E, codevelopment with Germany

Multiple rocket launcher 
 Teruel MRL

Armored cars 
 Bilbao Modelo 1932 – interwar vehicle
 UNL-35 – interwar vehicle
 AAC-1937 – interwar vehicle, codevelopment with Soviet Union
 URO VAMTAC - modern 4x4 vehicle

Armoured personnel carriers 
 BMR – modern 6x6 vehicle
 Dragón - modern 8x8 vehicle

Infantry fighting vehicles 
 VEC – modern 6x6 vehicle
 Pizarro IFV, codevelopment with Austria

Sri Lanka 
Armoured cars/fighting vehicles produced in Sri Lanka
 Unibuffel
 Unicorn
 UniAIMOV
 Unicob

Sudan 
 Ford 30 cwt Armoured Car (45) – operated by The Sudan Defence Force in WWII

Sweden 
Armoured fighting vehicles produced in Sweden

Tanks 
 Stridsvagn L-5 (prototype)
 Stridsvagn m/37 (48)
 Stridsvagn L-100 (prototype)
 Stridsvagn L-101 (prototype)
 Stridsvagn L-120 (prototype)
 Sridsvagn m/21-29 (10)
 Stridsvagn m/31 (3)
 Stridsvagn L-60 (215+)
 Stridsvagn m/41 (238)
 Stridsvagn m/42 (282)
 Stridsvagn 74 (659)
 Ikv 91 (212)
 Stridsvagn 103 (203)
 Stridsvagn 122 (91 produced under license)

Self propelled artillery 
 Stormartillerivagn m/43 (36)
 Luftvärnskanonvagn L-62 Anti II (142)
 Bandkanon 1 (26)

Armoured cars 
 Pansarbil m/39 (45)
 Landsverk L180, L181 and L182 (24)
 Landsverk L-185 (1 exported to Denmark as FP6)

Personnel carriers and infantry fighting vehicles 
 KP-bil (362)
 Pansarbandvagn 301 (185)
 Pansarbandvagn 302 (400+)
 Combat Vehicle 90 (1000+)
 Bandvagn 206 S (50)

Switzerland 
Armoured fighting vehicles produced in Switzerland
 Panzer 61
 Panzer 68
 Mowag Piranha – modern design available in 4x4, 6x6, 8x8, and 10x10 wheel versions.

Taiwan 
Armoured fighting vehicles produced in the Republic of China (Taiwan)

Tank

•CM-12

•CM-11

Wheeled armoured fighting vehicle
 CM-21
 CM22(M106)
 CM23(M125)
 CM24
 CM25(Improved TOW Vehicle)
 CM26(M577)
 CM27
 CM-32
 M41D
 Type 64

Thailand 
Armoured fighting vehicles produced in Thailand

Wheeled armoured fighting vehicle

• Black widow spider 8×8

• R-600 8×8

Wheeled armoured personnel carrier

•Frist win

•Phantom 380-x

•HMV-420p

Turkey 
Armoured fighting vehicles produced in Turkey

Tanks 
 MİTÜP Altay main battle tank
 M60T/Sabra
 Kaplan MT

Infantry fighting vehicles 
 ACV-S IFV
 ACV-300 IFV
 FNSS Kaplan 20 and 30 IFVs
 Otokar Tulpar IFV

Self propelled artillery
 FNSS ACV-19
 T-155 Fırtına

Self-propelled anti-aircraft weapons 
 Atilgan
 Zipkin
 Hisar-A
 KORKUT

Armoured personnel carriers and support vehicles
4x4 Armored vehicles:
 Otokar Cobra – Rubber tire-wheeled 4 x 4 Armoured Vehicle capable of carrying up to 8 personnel. It has an amphibious version as well.
 Otokar Cobra II
 Otokar Ural
 Otokar Kaya
 BMC Kirpi
 Otokar Kale
 Otokar Engerek
 Otokar Akrep
 Otokar Akrep II Armored Electric Vehicle
 BMC Kirpi II
 BMC Vuran MPAV
 BMC Amazon
 Nurol Ejder Yalçın
 FNSS Pars

6x6 and 8x8 Armored vehicles:
 Pars 8x8
 Pars 6x6
 Otokar DASW
 BMC MRAP
 Otokar Arma 6x6
 Otokar Arma 8x8
 Yavuz Variant of Terrex (APC 8x8)
 Nurol Ejder

Tracked armored vehicles:
 FNSS ACV-15
 FNSS ACV-30
 LAWC-T
 FNSS Kunduz
 FNSS Samur
 Tosun
 ACV-300 APC (Also see FNSS)
 ACV-S TLC
 IS-V

Ukraine 

Armoured fighting vehicles produced in Ukraine. Also see #Soviet Union on this page.

Armoured cars 
 Dozor-B
 VEPR

Tanks 
 T-80UD
 T-84
 T-84U
 T-84 Oplot
 T-84-120 Yatagan

Infantry carriers 
 BTR-3U
 BTR-4
 BTR-7
 BTR-94
 BMPV-64 heavy IFV
 BTRV-64 heavy APC
 BMT-72 heavy IFV
 BTMP-84 heavy IFV
 Kevlar-E

Support vehicles 
 BTS-5B ARV (Ukrainian version of BREM-1, based on T-72 tank)
 MTU-80 bridgelayer
 BREM-84 ARV
 BMU-84 bridgelayer

Upgrades 
 T-55AGM
 T-64U
 T-64BM
 T-72AM Banan
 T-72MP
 T-72AG
 T-72-120

United Kingdom 

Armoured fighting vehicles produced in the United Kingdom

Tanks

First World War 
 Little Willie (prototype; World War I)
 "Mother" (prototype; World War I)
 Mark I heavy tank (150; World War I)
 Mark II heavy tank (50; World War I)
 Mark III heavy tank (50; World War I)
 Mark IV heavy tank (1220; World War I)
 Mark V heavy tank (1242; World War I)
 Mark VIII "Liberty"  Anglo-American heavy tank (25, 1919)
 Mark IX armoured personnel carrier (34; World War I)
 Medium Mark A Whippet  medium tank (200; World War I)
 Medium Mark B medium tank (102; World War I)
 Medium Mark C medium tank (50; World War I)

Interwar 
 Vickers 6-Ton
 Light Tank Mk II
 Light Tank Mk III
 Light Tank Mk IV
 Light Tank Mk V
 Light Tank Mk VI
 Vickers A1E1 Independent tank prototype
 Vickers Medium Mark I
 Vickers Medium Mark II
 Vickers Medium Mark III
 Carden Loyd tankette

Second World War 
 A43 Black Prince prototype heavy tank
 Avenger prototype
 Light Tank Mk VII Tetrarch
 Light Tank Mk VIII prototype
 Cruiser Mk I
 Cruiser Mk II
 Cruiser Mk III
 Cruiser Mk IV
 Cruiser Mk V Covenanter
 Cruiser Mk VI Crusader
 Cruiser Mk VII Cavalier
 Cruiser Mk VIII Centaur
 Cruiser Mk VIII Cromwell
 Cruiser Mk VIII Challenger
 Comet
 Infantry Mk I Matilda
 Infantry Mk II Matilda
 Infantry Mk III Valentine
 Infantry Mk IV Churchill
 TOG 1 – prototype heavy tank
 TOG 2 – prototype heavy tank
 Excelsior prototype
 A39 Tortoise Heavy Assault Tank – prototype
 A34 Valiant – prototype

Post World War II
 Centurion
 FV4101 Charioteer (200)
 Conqueror (200) heavy tank
 Chieftain main battle tank
 Challenger 1 main battle tank
 Challenger 2 main battle tank
 Vickers MBT (Export market main battle tank)
 FV201 Universal Tank (A45) prototype
 FV4004 120 mm Gun Conway prototype
 FV4005 183 mm Gun Tank prototype

Self propelled artillery 
 Birch gun
 Alecto prototype
 Gun Carrier Mark I self-propelled artillery (48; World War I)
 Tracked Rapier – self-propelled AA missile launcher
 Abbot FV433 Self-propelled Artillery
 Bishop
 Deacon wheeled anti-tank gun
 17pdr SP Achilles US produced with British anti-tank gun
 17pdr SP Archer anti-tank gun
 AS-90

Armoured cars 
World War I
 Austin Armoured Car
 Rolls-Royce Armoured Car
 Lanchester 4x2 Armoured Car
 Fordson Armoured Car

Interwar
 Alvis-Straussler Armoured Car
 Lanchester 6x4 Armoured Car
 Peerless armoured car

World War II
 AEC Armoured Car
 Armadillo
 Coventry Armoured Car
 Daimler Armoured Car
 Daimler Dingo
 Guy Armoured Car
 Humber Armoured Car
 Humber Scout Car
 Humber Light Reconnaissance Car
 Morris CS9
 Morris Light Reconnaissance Car
 Standard Beaverette

Post World War II
 Alvis Saladin
 Ferret Scout Car
 Fox Armoured Reconnaissance Vehicle
 Land Rover Tangi- Northern Ireland internal security vehicle
 Shorland – Northern Ireland internal security vehicle

Armoured personnel carriers and support vehicles 
 Gun Carrier Crane armoured recovery vehicle (2; World War I)
 Sabre Armoured Reconnaissance Vehicle (136)
 FV101 Scorpion Armoured Reconnaissance Vehicle
 FV102 Striker Swingfire anti-tank missile launcher
 FV104 Samaritan armoured ambulance
 FV105 Sultan Armoured Command Vehicle
 FV106 Samson Armoured Recovery Vehicle
 FV107 Scimitar Armoured Reconnaissance Vehicle
 Warrior IFV
 Alvis Stormer armoured vehicle family
 FV 432 AFV armoured personnel carrier and variants
 FV222 Conqueror ARV
 Alvis Saracen armoured personnel carrier
 FV 1611 Humber Armoured Personnel Carrier
 FV103 Spartan Armoured Personnel Carrier
 Saxon Armoured Personnel Carrier
 Viking Armoured Vehicle
 Boxer (armoured fighting vehicle), with Germany and the Netherlands (modern)
 AEC Armoured Command Vehicle – World War II 4x4 or 6x6 armoured command vehicle.
 Guy Lizard – World War II 4x4 armoured command vehicle.
 Panther Command and Liaison Vehicle – 21st century vehicle to replace some CVRT and FV432
 Bedford OXA – World War II armoured lorry.
 Guy Universal Wheeled Carrier – World War II experimental 4x4 carrier.
 Pierce-Arrow Armoured AA Lorry – World War I vehicle.
 Thornycroft Bison – World War II armoured lorry.
 Universal Carrier – World War II

United States 

 

Armoured fighting vehicles produced in the United States

Tanks

Light tanks 
 Marmon-Herrington CTLS
 M1 Combat Car- 113 built
 M2 Light Tank (World War II, 10 M2A1, 239 M2A2, 72 M2A3, 375 M2A4)
 M3 Stuart tank
 M5 Stuart tank
 M22 Locust light airborne tank
 M24 Chaffee
 M41 Walker Bulldog
 M551 Sheridan light airborne tank
 M8 Armored Gun System
 M132 Armored Flamethrower
 M901 Improved TOW Vehicle
 Stingray Light Tank
 CCV-L Light Tank
 M56 SPG
 M50 Ontos Self-Propelled Rifle

Medium tanks 
 M2 Medium Tank
 M3 medium
 M3A1
 M3A2
 M3A3
 M3A4
 M3A5
 M4
 M4A1
 M4A1(76)W
 M4A1E4/M4A1(76)W
 M4A1E8/M4A1(76)W HVSS
 M4A1E9
 M4A2
 M4A2E8/M4A2(76)W HVSS
 M4A3
 M4A3W
 M4A3(75)
 M4A3E4/M4A3(76)W
 M4A3E8(76)W Easy Eight
 M4A3E8/M4A3(76)W HVSS
 M4A4
 M4A6
 M4 Dozer (fitted with dozer blade.)
 M4A3R3 Flame thrower Zippo
 T20 Medium Tank prototype

Heavy tanks 
 M6 Heavy Tank prototype
 T14 Heavy Tank prototype
 T29 Heavy Tank prototype
 T30 Heavy Tank prototype
 M26 Pershing (later reclassified as medium)

Assault tanks 
 M4A3E2 Jumbo
 T-28 Super Heavy Tank prototype
 M103 heavy tank

Main battle tanks 
 MBT-70 prototype
 M46 Patton
 M47 Patton
 M48 Patton
 M60 Patton
 M1 Abrams
 M1 Armored Recovery Vehicle ( Prototype Only )
 M1 Assault Breacher Vehicle ( Military Engineering Vehicle )
 M1 CATTB ( Prototype Only )
 M1 Grizzly Combat Mobility Vehicle ( Prototype Only )
 M1 Panther II ( Mine Clearing Vehicle )
 M1 Thumper ( Prototype Only )
 M1 TTB ( Prototype Only )
 M1IP
 M1A1
 M1A1AIM v.1
 M1A1AIM v.2
 M1A1FEP
 M1A1D
 M1A1HA
 M1A1HC
 M1A1KVT
 M1A1M ( Republic of Iraq Export Variant )
 M1A1SA ( Kingdom of Morocco Export Variant )
 M1A2
 M1A2S ( Kingdom of Saudi Arabia Export Variant )
 M1A2SEP v.1
 M1A2SEP v.2
 M1A2SEP v.3
 M1A3

Self propelled artillery 
 T19 Howitzer Motor Carriage
 T30 Howitzer Motor Carriage
 M21 Mortar Motor Carriage
 M13 Multiple Gun Motor Carriage
 M16 Multiple Gun Motor Carriage
 M109 155 mm SP Howitzer Paladin
 M110 8-inch Howitzer
 M84 Mortar Carrier
 M42 40 mm Self-Propelled Anti-Aircraft Gun
 M163 Vulcan Air Defense System
 M247 Sgt. York DIVAD
 M6 Bradley Linebacker SHORAD
 M730 Chaparral self-propelled SAM launcher

Personnel carriers and infantry fighting vehicles 
 LVTP7/AAVP7A1 amphibious armoured carrier
 M2/M3 Bradley Fighting Vehicle Infantry and Cavalry Fighting Vehicles
 M1120 Series
 M59 Armored Personnel Carrier
 M75 Armored Personnel Carrier
 M113 Armored Personnel Carrier
 M56 Coyote Light Smoke Generator Vehicle
 Cadillac Gage Commando V-150 APC (300 for Taiwan)
 LAV-25 Amphibious Reconnaissance / Infantry fighting vehicle made by General Dynamics Land Systems Canada.

Armoured cars 
 American LaFrance TK-6 – built for Persia
 Cadillac Gage V-100 Commando – Postwar 4 wheel armoured car / APC
 Jeffery Armored Car – World War I
 King armored car, World War I vehicle for the short-lived 1st Armored Car Squadron (United States Marines)
 LAV-300
 M1 Armored Car – interwar
 M2 Scout Car – interwar
 M3 Scout Car – World War II
 M8 Greyhound
 M38 Wolfhound prototype
 M1117 Armored Security Vehicle – modern 4x4 design.
 M1200 Armored Knight - LAV
 T7 Combat Car – interwar
 T11 Armored Car – interwar
 T13 Armored Car – World War II
 T17 Deerhound – World War II
 T17E1 Staghound – World War II
 T18 Boarhound – World War II
 T19 Armored Car – World War II
 T21 Armored Car – World War II
 T22 / M8 Greyhound – World War II
 T23 Armored Car – World War II
 T27 Armored Car – World War II
 T28 / M38 Wolfhound – World War II
 ULTRA AP – Concept replacement for Humvee.

Amphibious vehicles 
 LVT-1
 LVT-2 Water Buffalo
 LVT(A)-1
 LVT(A)-2 Water Buffalo
 LVT-4 Water Buffalo
 LVT(A)-3
 LVT-3 Bushmaster
 LVT(A)-4
 LVT(A)-5
 LVT-3C
 DUKW (Six-wheel-drive amphibious truck with a provision for an MG mount.)
 Sherman DD amphibious tank (DD – Duplex drive)

Armored half-tracks 
 M2 Half Track Car
 M3 Half-track
 M5 Half-track
 M9 Half-track

Vietnam

Infantry fighting vehicles 

 XCB-01

Amphibious armoured personnel carriers 

 XTC-02

Zimbabwe 
Armoured fighting vehicles designed and produced in Rhodesia and Zimbabwe

Infantry fighting vehicles 
 Bullet
 Gazelle
 Mine Protected Combat Vehicle

Armoured personnel carriers 
 Crocodile
 Leopard
 MAP-45
 MAP-75
 Pig

Mine detection vehicles 
 Pookie

See also 
 List of World War I armoured fighting vehicles
 List of armoured fighting vehicles of World War II
 List of modern armoured fighting vehicles
 List of artillery
 List of tanks
 List of Soviet tanks
 Tank
 History of the tank
 List of "M" series military vehicles
 List of main battle tanks by country
 Military equipment of Axis Power forces in Balkans and Russian Front

References

Notes

Bibliography 
 
 
 
 
 
 
 Porter, David (2009). Western Allied Tanks 1939–1945. Amber Books Ltd. 

 
country